The 2018–19 Georgetown Hoyas women's basketball team represents Georgetown University in the 2018–19 college basketball season. The Hoyas, led by second year head coach James Howard and were members of the Big East Conference. The Hoyas play their home games at the McDonough Gymnasium. They finished the season 19–16, 9–9 in Big East play to finish in a tie for fourth place. They advanced to the semifinals of the Big East women's tournament where they lost to Marquette. They received an at-large bid to the WNIT where they defeated Sacred Heart, Harvard, Big East member Providence in the first, second and third rounds before losing to James Madison in the quarterfinals.

Roster

Schedule

|-
!colspan=9 style=| Non-conference regular season

|-
!colspan=9 style=| Big East regular season

|-
!colspan=9 style=| Big East Women's Tournament

|-
!colspan=9 style=| WNIT

Rankings
2018–19 NCAA Division I women's basketball rankings

See also
 2018–19 Georgetown Hoyas men's basketball team

References

Georgetown
Georgetown Hoyas women's basketball seasons
Georgetown